Notizie degli scavi (internationally released as News from the Excavations) is a 2010 Italian drama film directed by Emidio Greco. It is based on the novel with the same name written by Franco Lucentini. It premiered, out of competition, at the 67th Venice International Film Festival. The film was awarded with two Globi D'Oro for best director and for best screenplay.

Cast 
Giuseppe Battiston : Il professore
Ambra Angiolini : La marchesa
Iaia Forte : La signora
Giorgia Salari : Lea

References

External links

2010 films
Italian drama films
Films based on Italian novels
Films directed by Emidio Greco
2010 drama films
Films scored by Luis Bacalov
2010s Italian films

it:Il consiglio d'Egitto (film)